The 1969–70 National Football League was the 39th staging of the National Football League (NFL), an annual Gaelic football tournament for the Gaelic Athletic Association county teams of Ireland.

Mayo beat Down in the final. The funeral of J. J. Cribbin, who scored two goals and a point in the final, occurred exactly fifty years later.

Format

Round-robin format
 Division Two (B) and Division Three (A): Played as a double round-robin.
 All other groups: Single Round-Robin. Each team played every other team in its division (or group where the division is split) once, either home or away.

Titles
Teams in all four divisions competed for the National Football League title.

Teams that did not qualify for the inter-divisional play-offs completed for the Supplementary League Title. There was a severe lack of interest in this league, with considerable delays in organising fixtures in the Southern section. When the final was eventually played, fewer than 100 people attended.

League Phase

Division One

Inter-group play-offs

Division Two

Inter-group play-offs

Division Three

Inter-group play-offs

Division Four

Group A play-offs

Inter-group play-offs

Supplementary League
A: Longford,
B: Kilkenny, Waterford, Carlow

Group A Regulation Games

Group B Regulation Games

Supplementary League Final

Knockout Phase

Semi-finals

Finals

References

National Football League
National Football League
National Football League (Ireland) seasons